Gary Wurth  is an Australian former professional rugby league footballer who played in the 1980s and 1990s for the Canberra Raiders, Eastern Suburbs Roosters and the Newcastle Knights in the New South Wales Rugby League premiership and National Rugby League competitions.

Background
Wurth was born in Canberra, Australian Capital Territory.

Playing career
A wholehearted player, Wurth played 73 matches for the Roosters scoring 35 tries. Wurth scored a hat-trick of tries in Easts last match at the Sydney Sports Ground.

In 1989 the Fullback was selected in the NSW Country representative side.

References

Australian rugby league players
Living people
Country New South Wales Origin rugby league team players
Newcastle Knights players
Canberra Raiders players
Sydney Roosters players
Rugby league fullbacks
1961 births